Wadhwan was a princely state during the British Raj.

The town of Wadhwan in the Saurashtra region of Gujarat was its capital. Its last ruler signed the accession to the Indian Union on 15 February 1948.

History
Wadhwan was founded as a state around 1630. It became a British protectorate in 1807. The rulers of the state bore the title 'Thakur Sahib'.

Rulers
Rulers were styled 'Thakur Sahib'

 1681 – 1707 Bhagatsinhji Udaisinhji
 1707 – 1739 Arjansinhji Madhavsinhji (d. 1739)
 1739 – 1765 Sabalsinhji Arjansinhji II (d. 1765)
 1765 – 1778 Chandrasinhji Sabalsinhji (d. 1778)
 1778 – 1807 Prithirajji Chandrasinhji (d. 1807)
 1807 – 1827 Jalamsinhji Prithirajji (d. 1827)
 1827 – 1875 Raisinhji Jalamsinhji (d. 1875)
 1875 –  5 May 1885 Dajiraji Chandrasinhji (b. 1861 – d. 1885)
 20 May 1885 – 25 May 1910 Balsinhji Chandrasinhji (b. 1863 – d. 1910)
 25 May 1910 – 22 February 1918 Jashwantsinhji Becharsinhji (d. 1918)
 22 February 1918 – 1934 Jorawarsinhji Jashwantsinhji (b. 1899 – d. 1934)
 1934 – 15 August 1947 Surendrasinhji Jorawarsinhji (b. 1922 – d. 1983)

See also
 Western India States Agency

References

External links

Kathiawar Agency
Princely states of India
Surendranagar district
Rajputs
1630 establishments in India
1948 disestablishments in India